Cargo airlines (or air freight carriers, and derivatives of these names) are airlines mainly dedicated to the transport of cargo by air. Some cargo airlines are divisions or subsidiaries of larger passenger airlines.
In 2018, airline cargo traffic represented 262,333 million tonne-kilometres with a 49.3% load factor: % for dedicated cargo operations, and % within mixed operations (belly freight of passenger airliners).

Freight rates

Amid the COVID-19 pandemic, adjusted cargo capacity fell by 4.4% in February while air cargo demand also fell by 9.1%, but the near-halt in passenger traffic cut capacity even deeper as half of global air cargo is carried in passenger jets’ bellies.
Air freight rates rose as a consequence, from $0.80 per kg for transatlantic cargoes to $2.50-4 per kg, enticing passenger airlines to operate cargo-only flights through the use of preighters, while cargo airlines bring back into service fuel-guzzling stored aircraft, helped by falling oil prices.

Logistics

Air transport is a component of many international logistics networks, managing and controlling the flow of goods, energy, information and other resources like products, services, and people, from the source of production to the marketplace. Logistics involves the geographical repositioning of raw materials, work in process, and finished inventories.

Aircraft used

Larger cargo airlines tend to use new or recently built aircraft to carry their freight. However, many still utilize older aircraft, including those no longer suited for passenger service, like the Boeing 707, Boeing 727, Douglas DC-8, McDonnell Douglas DC-10, McDonnell Douglas MD-11, Airbus A300, and the Ilyushin Il-76. Examples of the 80+-year-old Douglas DC-3 are still flying around the world carrying cargo (as well as passengers). Short range turboprop airliners such as the Antonov An-12, Antonov An-26, Fokker Friendship, and British Aerospace ATP are being modified to accept standard air freight pallets to extend their working lives. This normally involves the replacement of glazed windows with opaque panels, the strengthening of the cabin floor and insertion of a broad top-hinged door in one side of the fuselage.

The Antonov An-225 Mriya, an enlarged version of the Antonov An-124 Ruslan, was the world's largest aircraft, used for transporting large shipments and oversized cargos.

Usage of large military airplanes for commercial purposes, pioneered by Ukraine's Antonov Airlines in the 1990s, has allowed new types of cargo in aerial transportation.

In the past, some cargo airlines would carry a few passengers from time to time on flights, and UPS Airlines once unsuccessfully tried a passenger charter airline division.

The Boeing 747 is also widely used as a cargo aircraft. The latest aircraft in the wide-body series is the Boeing 747-8.

Type of cargo airlines 

By freight tonne-kilometres flown (millions):

Largest Cargo Carriers

Some more large cargo carriers are:

All-cargo subsidiary

The following are freight divisions of passenger airlines operating their own or leased freighter aircraft. Some have shut down or merged with others:

The following are freight divisions without freighter fleets, using passenger aircraft holds or having other cargo airlines fly on their behalf. Some of these previously had freighters:

These carriers operate freighter aircraft but do not have cargo divisions:

These carriers operate freighter aircraft exclusively

See also
 Airlift
 Cargo aircraft
 Cargo terminal
 Counter-to-counter package
 Dangerous goods
 List of cargo airlines

References

External links

 

 
Air freight
Airline-related lists
Airline types